Hoseynabad (also Romanized as Ḩoseynābād) is a village in Salehabad Rural District, Salehabad County, Razavi Khorasan Province, Iran. At the 2006 census, its population was 382, in 95 families.

References 

Populated places in   Torbat-e Jam County